In Greek mythology, Bia (Ancient Greek: Βία ; "force, strength") is the personification of force.

Family 
Bia was the daughter of the Titan Pallas and Oceanid Styx, and sister of Nike, Kratos, and Zelus.

 From Pallas the giant and Styx [were born]: Scylla, Vis (Force) [Bia], Invidia (Jealousy) [Zelos], Potestas (Power) [Kratos], Victoria (Victory) [Nike].

Mythology 
Bia and her siblings were constant companions of Zeus. They achieved this honour after supporting him in the Titan War along with their mother. Bia is one of the characters named in the Greek tragedy Prometheus Bound, attributed to Aeschylus, where Hephaestus is compelled by the gods to bind Prometheus after he was caught stealing fire and offering the gift to mortals. Although she appears alongside her brother Kratos, she does not speak.

Titanomachy 
Along with their mother, Bia and her siblings helped Zeus in his war against the Titans. The war, which was referred to as the Titanomachy, lasted for ten years, with the Olympian gods emerging victorious. Due to their heroic actions during the war, the four siblings won Zeus's respect and became his constant companions. They were almost always by his side as he sat on his throne in Mount Olympus, and they were tasked with enforcing Zeus's orders whenever he required an act of strength.

Prometheus' punishment 
Bia is not as well known as her siblings Kratos or Nike, and when she appears in myths, she is usually silent. However, she does play a pivotal role in the story of Prometheus. Prometheus was one of the Titans and was often in conflict with Zeus. Eventually, he angered Zeus so much that he decided to punish him for all of eternity. He ordered that Prometheus be chained to a rock in the Caucasus Mountains. Bia and her brother, Kratos, were sent to carry out this task, but Bia was the only one strong enough to actually bind Prometheus to the rock with the unbreakable chains. Each day, an eagle would pluck out Prometheus's liver and eat it in front of him. Each night his liver would regrow, and the cycle would begin again, leaving him in perpetual torment.

Worship 

According to Pausanias, there was a sanctuary to Bia and Ananke on the Acrocorinth.

Family tree

Notes

References 

 Aeschylus, translated in two volumes. 1. Prometheus Bound by Herbert Weir Smyth, Ph. D. Cambridge, MA. Harvard University Press. 1926. Online version at the Perseus Digital Library. Greek text available from the same website.
 Apollodorus, The Library with an English Translation by Sir James George Frazer, F.B.A., F.R.S. in 2 Volumes, Cambridge, MA, Harvard University Press; London, William Heinemann Ltd. 1921. . Online version at the Perseus Digital Library. Greek text available from the same website.
Hesiod, Theogony from The Homeric Hymns and Homerica with an English Translation by Hugh G. Evelyn-White, Cambridge, MA.,Harvard University Press; London, William Heinemann Ltd. 1914. Online version at the Perseus Digital Library. Greek text available from the same website.
 Gaius Julius Hyginus, Fabulae from The Myths of Hyginus translated and edited by Mary Grant. University of Kansas Publications in Humanistic Studies. Online version at the Topos Text Project.
 Pausanias, Description of Greece with an English Translation by W.H.S. Jones, Litt.D., and H.A. Ormerod, M.A., in 4 Volumes. Cambridge, MA, Harvard University Press; London, William Heinemann Ltd. 1918. . Online version at the Perseus Digital Library
Pausanias, Graeciae Descriptio. 3 vols. Leipzig, Teubner. 1903.  Greek text available at the Perseus Digital Library.

Greek war deities
War goddesses
Greek goddesses
Personifications in Greek mythology
Olympian deities